The women's 4 × 100 metres relay event at the 2008 Olympic Games took place on 21 and 22 August at the Beijing Olympic Stadium.

There were 16 NOCs competing at this event, selected by the average of the two best marks at the qualifying period. Finland and Cuba qualified but withdrew, and were replaced by Thailand and Nigeria.

Originally, the Russian team won the gold medal, but were disqualified in 2016 after Yuliya Chermoshanskaya had her blood and urine samples re-analyzed, and tested positive for two prohibited substances. One of her teammates, Yulia Guschina, was also later sanctioned for doping.

Records
Prior to this competition, the existing world and Olympic records were as follows.

No new world or Olympic records were set for this event.

Qualification summary

Results
All times shown are in seconds.
Q denotes automatic qualification.
q denotes fastest losers.
DNS denotes did not start.
DNF denotes did not finish.
DSQ denotes disqualified
AR denotes area record.
NR denotes national record.
PB denotes personal best.
SB denotes season's best.

Round 1
First 3 in each heat(Q) and the next 2 fastest(q) advance to the Final.

Final

References
Notes

Sources

Athletics at the 2008 Summer Olympics
Relay foot races at the Olympics
Olympics 2008
2008 in women's athletics
Women's events at the 2008 Summer Olympics